Circles is an EP album by the indie rock group Heroes & Zeros, released in May 2006. All lyrics were written by Hans Jørgen Undelstvedt, all music by Hans Jørgen Undelstvedt, Lars Løberg Tofte, and Arne Kjelsrud Mathisen.

Track listing
"Circles"
"Rupture 180"
"Intermission"
"Over the Moon"
"Come Home"

External links
 Official Website
 Heroes & Zeros Blog on My Opera
 Heroes & Zeros at MySpace
 Heroes & Zeros at Last.fm

Heroes & Zeros albums